Jean-Pierre Barra (born 16 May 1939) is a Belgian sprinter. He competed in the men's 200 metres at the 1960 Summer Olympics.

References

External links
 

1939 births
Living people
Athletes (track and field) at the 1960 Summer Olympics
Belgian male sprinters
Olympic athletes of Belgium
Place of birth missing (living people)